Daniel Edward Porter (October 17, 1931 – January 7, 2017) was an outfielder in Major League Baseball. He played for the Washington Senators.

References

External links

1931 births
2017 deaths
Major League Baseball outfielders
Washington Senators (1901–1960) players
Baseball players from Illinois
Sportspeople from Decatur, Illinois